Steve Turner (born 27 December 1960) is a former Australian rules footballer who played with Melbourne and St Kilda in the Victorian Football League (VFL).

Notes

External links 
		
DemonWiki page

1960 births
Australian rules footballers from Western Australia
Melbourne Football Club players
St Kilda Football Club players
Living people
Perth Football Club players
Swan Districts Football Club coaches